In enzymology, a histidinol-phosphate transaminase is an enzyme that catalyzes the chemical reaction

L-histidinol phosphate + 2-oxoglutarate  3-(imidazol-4-yl)-2-oxopropyl phosphate + L-glutamate

Thus, the two substrates of this enzyme are L-histidinol phosphate and 2-oxoglutarate, whereas its two products are 3-(imidazol-4-yl)-2-oxopropyl phosphate and L-glutamate.

This enzyme belongs to the family of transferases, specifically the transaminases, which transfer nitrogenous groups.  The systematic name of this enzyme class is L-histidinol-phosphate:2-oxoglutarate aminotransferase. Other names in common use include imidazolylacetolphosphate transaminase, glutamic-imidazoleacetol phosphate transaminase, histidinol phosphate aminotransferase, imidazoleacetol phosphate transaminase, L-histidinol phosphate aminotransferase, histidine:imidazoleacetol phosphate transaminase, IAP transaminase, and imidazolylacetolphosphate aminotransferase.  This enzyme participates in 5 metabolic pathways: histidine metabolism, tyrosine metabolism, phenylalanine metabolism, phenylalanine, tyrosine and tryptophan biosynthesis, and novobiocin biosynthesis.  It employs one cofactor, pyridoxal phosphate.

Structural studies

References

 
 

EC 2.6.1
Pyridoxal phosphate enzymes
Enzymes of known structure